Happy Feet is the third album by the Canadian jazz singer and actress Emilie-Claire Barlow. It was released in 2003.

Track listing
 "Gentle Rain"
 "Freddie Freeloader"
 "Bem Bom"
 "I'll Be Around"
 "Joy Spring"
 "Bye Bye Blackbird"
 "It's Only A Paper Moon"
 "I'm Old Fashioned"
 "Stompin' At The Savoy"
 "Smoke Gets In Your Eyes"
 "Broadway"
 "Zabumba No Mar"

2003 albums
Emilie-Claire Barlow albums